Paskal Milo (born 22 February 1949) is an Albanian historian, politician, and leader of the Social Democracy Party of Albania. He has also been a member of the Albanian Parliament since 1992, and a professor of Albanian and Foreign literature. Milo has held various posts under the Albanian government in the late 1990s and early 2000s, notably that of Foreign Minister.

Milo was born in Palasë, a village of the Himarë municipality, Vlorë County. He graduated in the University of Tirana and holds a PhD degree. After the post of Foreign Minister of Albania, he has been a Minister for the European Integration of Albania in 2001–2002.

References

1949 births
Living people
People from Himara
Social Democratic Party of Albania politicians
Government ministers of Albania
Foreign ministers of Albania
Albanian diplomats
Members of the Parliament of Albania
Political party leaders of Albania
Albanian academics
University of Tirana alumni